Streptomyces caeni is a bacterium species from the genus of Streptomyces which has been isolated from mangrove mud from Sanya in China.

See also 
 List of Streptomyces species

References 

caeni
Bacteria described in 2018